San Giuliano del Sannio is a comune (municipality) in the Province of Campobasso in the Italian region Molise, located about  south of Campobasso.

San Giuliano del Sannio borders the following municipalities: Cercepiccola, Guardiaregia, Mirabello Sannitico, Sepino, Vinchiaturo.

References

External links
 Official website

Cities and towns in Molise